Sunburst Records can refer to any of the following:
"Sunburst Records", a subsidiary of the now defunct Opal Productions which played host to Melvin Bliss' records
"Sunburst Records", a label used by the Pine Hill Haints